The Canada Stadium is a tennis stadium in the Tel Aviv District city of Ramat HaSharon, Israel. It is the country’s main tennis venue, and is used mainly by the Israeli Davis Cup and Fed Cup teams.

History
Canada Stadium, seating 4,500 spectators, opened in 1977 on land that had been an old strawberry patch, which was given to the Israel Tennis Centers (ITC) by the government.  It was part of an ITC project that included the opening of 13 other tennis centres in the country.  After the opening, floodlights were added to the court, so that play could continue into the night.

The stadium is the "main court" of the tennis centre at Ramat Hasharon, which is the biggest in the country.  A large number of up-and-coming Israeli tennis professionals regularly train at the centre, as well as some top-quality players.

Future extension
On December 20, 2007, it was announced that the capacity of the stadium would increase to around 9,000, by 2012. It is estimated that the total cost of the project will be around $4 million.  Also, a roof will be installed over the court, so that play will be able to continue in the event of rain. As of April 2022, these plans have not yet materialised.

References 

Tennis venues in Israel
Tennis in Israel
Sport in Ramat HaSharon
Sports venues in Tel Aviv District